Shergino is a rural locality (a selo) in Kabansky District, Republic of Buryatia, Russia. The population was 627 as of 2010. There are 13 streets.

Geography 
Shergino is located 32 km northeast of Kabansk (the district's administrative centre) by road. Khandala is the nearest rural locality.

References 

Rural localities in Kabansky District